The Penn State Nittany Lions women represented Penn State University in CHA women's ice hockey during the 2017-18 NCAA Division I women's ice hockey season.

Standings

Roster

2017–18 Nittany Lions

Schedule

|-
!colspan=12 style=""| Regular Season

|-
!colspan=12 style=""| CHA Tournament

Awards and honors

References

Penn State
Penn State women's ice hockey seasons